Alvin C. York Institute, also known as Alvin C. York Agricultural Institute or York Institute, is a public high school in Jamestown, Tennessee, founded as a private agricultural school in 1926 by World War I hero Alvin York and later transferred to the state of Tennessee in 1937, which continues to operate it as a public high school. It is the only comprehensive secondary school in the United States that is financed and operated by a state government.

History
Alvin C. York established the school that carries his name during the 1920s in the county seat of his home county of Fentress. His goal was to give rural children the chance to obtain a high school education. Beginning in 1919 he toured the United States raising funds for the school, using his status as a war hero to get public attention and raising a total of $10,000. He also solicited and received funds from the state legislature, which contributed $50,000, and from Fentress County, which pledged $50,000. Classes began in 1929 and the school operated privately until 1937, when financial pressures related to the Great Depression led York to transfer the school to the state of Tennessee, which continues to operate it as a public school as a living memorial to York.

Campus
The school sits on a campus of over  that is said to be the world's largest public high school campus. The campus is designated as a Tennessee Wildlife Resources Agency wildlife management area and includes a working farm where students participate in managing a herd of Limousin cattle. Five ponds on the campus are used for livestock watering, sport fishing, and waterfowl feeding and nesting.

Campus buildings currently in use include the Main Administration Building (c. 1980),
Social Sciences Building (a later addition to the original school), Science Building,
Alvin C. York JROTC Building (c. 1940s), and Fentress County Vocational Training Center (c. 1970s).

The Jamestown Community Center and Jamestown Community Park are located near the school on York Institute land.

Historic building
The original two-story brick administration building, built in 1928, is the centerpiece of the Alvin C. York Agricultural Institute Historic District, which is listed on the National Register of Historic Places. The school building was replaced with a new building in the 1980s and subsequently has deteriorated. In 2005 the Tennessee Preservation Trust listed it on its yearly list of the state's "most endangered" historic sites.

In January 2008 the Tennessee Department of Education proposed that it be demolished, and estimated the cost of demolition at $3.6 million, while renovation would cost $3.7 million. Due to safety concerns, state officials blocked off access to the old building and all areas within  of the walls, thus preventing the use of four classrooms in the school's current main building, which is adjacent to the original building. On July 15, 2008, an agreement was reached between the state building and education departments and the Sgt. York Patriotic Foundation, which agreed to oversee and fund the restoration of the historic structure. As of January 2010, the building had been stabilized and initial remediation was complete, at a total cost of about $1 million.

Curriculum
The school enrolls students in grades 9 through 12. It operates on a block schedule, in which the fall and spring semesters are each divided into five blocks, and students take five classes each semester. York also offers vocational programs including agriculture, automotive technology, residential construction technology, metal technology, nursing, accounting, and information management systems.

York Institute was one of nine Tennessee school districts to participate in the Appalachian Mathematics and Science Partnership, funded by the National Science Foundation with the goal enhancing science, mathematics and technology education in Appalachian region schools with low socioeconomic status and student achievement.

Dual-Enrollment

Through the efforts of a local foundation and through cooperation with Roane State Community College, York Institute is able to provide its students with undergraduate-level college coursework free of charge to all students. Classes offered include College Algebra, American History I & II, English Comp I & II, Psychology, Sociology, Spanish, etc. Students enrolled in these courses obtain both college and high-school credit and can earn up to two years worth of college credit.

Vocational Certification

The York Institute also provides a CNA certification program to all students free of charge. The students can apply for and obtain their CNA licensure after a semester of coursework and clinical observation is completed. The school also provides a classroom and shop area for the Tennessee Technological Center to offer Welding courses at the school site.

Community Education
The Alvin C. York Institute also operates a community education program. The program consists of various classes, events, and resources that are available to the community at no cost. The major goal of this project is to involve parents and community members in educational programs. Community education classes allow the community to become familiar with the school their children or grandchildren attend. A concerted effort is made to enhance the value placed on education. Courses offered range from basic to graduate level courses as well as many arts and crafts courses. Funding for this program is provided by Union Bank of Jamestown.

Extracurricular activities and clubs
Extracurricular clubs and organizations offered at York Institute include:

 Chorus
 Drama
 Journalism
 Art
 Student Council
 JROTC
 Family Career Community Leaders of America (FCCLA)
 Future Business Leaders of America (FBLA)
 Fellowship of Christian Athletes (FCA)
 Student Christian Club
 Health Occupations Students of America (HOSA)
 Scholars' Bowl
 Future Farmers of America (FFA)
 Skills USA
 Envirothon
 Pep Club
 Math Club
 English Club
 Spanish Club
 BETA Club
 Tennessee Scholars
 National Honors Society
 Interact Club
 Future Teachers of America

Sports
 Football
 Boys & Girls Basketball
 Baseball
 Softball
 Boys & Girls Soccer
 Boys & Girls Track
 Boys & Girls Bowling
 Boys & Girls Golf
 Cross Country

Honors and awards
In 1989 York Institute was recognized as a National Blue Ribbon School of Excellence. In 1992 it was one of 140 public secondary schools recognized by Redbook magazine as "America's Best Schools." It was a recipient of a Tennessee Department of Education 2006 Best Practices in Character Education Merit Award.

Notable alumni
Roger Crouch, astronaut
Lincoln Davis, U.S. Congressman

References

External links
York Institute website
York Institute—A Legacy in Distress by Dr. Michael E. Birdwell
National Register of Historic Places Continuation Sheet: York, Alvin C., Agricultural Institute Historic District, Fentress County, Tennessee (additional documentation), by Michael E. Birdwell (August 28, 2008)

Schools in Fentress County, Tennessee
Public high schools in Tennessee
Historic districts on the National Register of Historic Places in Tennessee
Educational institutions established in 1926
1926 establishments in Tennessee
National Register of Historic Places in Fentress County, Tennessee